James Starr Tait (December 5, 1885 – August 20, 1948) was a Canadian politician. He served in the Legislative Assembly of New Brunswick as member of the Progressive Conservative party from 1939 to 1948.

References

1885 births
1948 deaths
20th-century Canadian politicians
20th-century Canadian lawyers
Progressive Conservative Party of New Brunswick MLAs
Politicians from Saint John, New Brunswick